Sara Ketiš (born 16 September 1996) is a Slovenian footballer who plays as a forward for Italian Serie A club ASD Pink Sport Time and the Slovenia women's national team.

References

External links

1996 births
Living people
Women's association football forwards
Slovenian women's footballers
Slovenia women's international footballers
Serie A (women's football) players
A.S.D. Pink Sport Time players
Slovenian expatriate footballers
Slovenian expatriate sportspeople in Italy
Expatriate women's footballers in Italy
ŽNK MB Tabor players